Muricopsis (Muricopsis) pauxilla is a species of sea snail, a marine gastropod mollusk in the family Muricidae, the murex snails or rock snails.

Description
The size of an adult shell varies between 9 mm and 18 mm.

Distribution
This marine species is distributed in the Gulf of California, along Western Mexico

References

External links
 

Muricidae
Gastropods described in 1854